Mugnano del Cardinale is a town and comune of the province of Avellino in the Campania region of southern Italy.

Geography
Baiano, Mercogliano, Monteforte Irpino, Quadrelle, Sirignano, Visciano are nearby towns.

Sights
The town houses the Basilica of Saint Philomena which has been important as a pilgrimage site.

References

Cities and towns in Campania